Brazil is divided into several types and levels of subdivisions.

Regions

Since 1942, the Brazilian Institute of Geography and Statistics has divided Brazil into five geographic regions. On 23 November 1970, the regions of Brazil were adjusted slightly to the definition that is still in use today. The division into regions is merely academic and statistical, as the regions do not enjoy any political autonomy.

North Region (Região Norte)
Northeast Region (Região Nordeste)
Central-West Region (Região Centro-Oeste)
Southeast Region (Região Sudeste)
South Region (Região Sul)

States

Brazil is divided into 27 federative units: 26 states and 1 federal district (Distrito Federal).

  (AC)
  (AL)
  (AP)
  (AZ)
  (BA)
  (CE)
  (ES)
  (GO)
  (MA)
  (MT)
  (MS)
  (MG)
  (PA)
  (PB)
  (PR)
  (PE)
  (PI)
  (RJ)
  (RN)
  (RS)
  (RO)
  (RR)
  (SC)
  (SP)
  (SE)
  (TO)
  (DF)

Municipalities

The lowest level of political division of Brazil are the municipalities, which also enjoy political and economical autonomy. There are over 5500 municipalities in Brazil, comprising almost the entirety of the country's territory. The only exceptions are the Federal District (not divided into municipalities, but into 33 administrative regions, without any political autonomy) and the archipelago of Fernando de Noronha, which consists in a state district.

Statistical Areas

For statistical purposes, Brazilian states and the Federal District are divided into "Intermediate Geographic Regions", which themselves are divided into smaller "Immediate Geographic Regions" (Regiões Geográficas Imediatas) which correspond to a metropolitan area. From 1989-2017, they were grouped into mesoregions and microregions.

See also
ISO 3166-2:BR
Proposed states and territories of Brazil
Former subdivisions of Brazil
Indigenous territories

References